Aleeza Khan is an Indian actress, known for Ghar Ki Lakshmi Betiyann (2006) and C.I.D. (1998). She also worked in the serial Qubool Hai.

Aleeza's first TV show was Ghar Ki Laxmi Betiyan (Zee TV) and her first movie was Chand Bujh Gaya. Her favorite roles from her TV serials are Gauri from Ghar Ki Laxmi Betiyan, Angna from Jhilmil Sitaaron Ka Aangan Hoga and Amrita Dhanrajgir from Pyar Ka Dard Hai Meetha Meetha Pyaara Pyaara.

Recently, she was seen on SAB TV's Maddam Sir where she is played the roles of Pinky, Aparna Bhansal, Zeenat and Charulata.

References

External links
 
 

Indian soap opera actresses
Living people
Place of birth missing (living people)
20th-century Indian actresses
21st-century Indian actresses
Actors from Mumbai
1987 births